WUKL is a Contemporary Christian-formatted broadcast radio station licensed to Masontown, Pennsylvania, serving Uniontown, Pennsylvania, Morgantown, West Virginia, and Kingwood, West Virginia.

WUKL is owned and operated by Educational Media Foundation, broadcasting EMF's K-LOVE format.

External links
K-Love Online

UKL
Radio stations established in 1992
K-Love radio stations
1992 establishments in Pennsylvania
Educational Media Foundation radio stations
UKL